is a Japanese track cyclist. At the 2012 Summer Olympics, he competed in the Men's sprint.

References

External links
 Keirin profile 

Japanese male cyclists
Living people
Olympic cyclists of Japan
Cyclists at the 2012 Summer Olympics
Cyclists at the 2016 Summer Olympics
Japanese track cyclists
1979 births
Asian Games medalists in cycling
Cyclists at the 2014 Asian Games
Medalists at the 2014 Asian Games
Asian Games gold medalists for Japan
Asian Games bronze medalists for Japan